The 1964 Vanderbilt Commodores football team represented Vanderbilt University in the 1964 NCAA University Division football season. The Commodores were led by head coach John Green in his second season and finished the season with a record of three wins, six losses and one tie (3–6–1 overall, 1–4–1 in the SEC).

Schedule

References

Vanderbilt
Vanderbilt Commodores football seasons
Vanderbilt Commodores football